Dąbkowice  is a settlement in the administrative district of Gmina Darłowo, within Sławno County, West Pomeranian Voivodeship, in north-western Poland. It is located on the Slovincian Coast between the Baltic Sea in the north-west and Lake Bukowo in the south-east.

The settlement has a population of 1.

References

Villages in Sławno County